The 2022 McDonald's All-American Boys Game was an all-star basketball game that was played on March 29, 2022, at Wintrust Arena in Chicago, Illinois. The game's rosters featured the best and most highly recruited high school boys graduating in the class of 2022. The game was the 45th annual version of the McDonald's All-American Game first played in 1977. Due to the impact of the COVID-19 pandemic, the game had not been held since 2019.
The 24 players were selected from over 700 nominees by a committee of basketball experts. They were chosen not only for their on-court skills, but for their performances off the court as well.  Dariq Whitehead of the East had 13 points, seven rebounds and seven assists, and was named the game's most valuable player (MVP) .

Rosters
The roster was announced on January 25, 2022.  Arkansas, Duke and Kansas had the most selections with three each, while Alabama, Kentucky, Texas, and UCLA had two each. At the announcement of roster selections, only 14 schools were represented and two players were uncommitted. On March 28, 2022, Anthony Black committed to Arkansas.

Team East

Team West

^undecided at the time of roster selection
~undecided at game time
Reference

Box Score

References

McDonald's All-American Boys Game
McDonald's All-American